Cheick Aboubacar Camara (born 16 April 1998) is a Guinean sprinter. In 2019, he competed in the men's 100 metres event at the 2019 World Athletics Championships in Doha, Qatar. He competed in the preliminary round and he did not advance to compete in the heats.

In 2014, he competed in the boys' 100 metres event at the 2014 Summer Youth Olympics held in Nanjing, China.

In 2019, he also represented Guinea at the 2019 African Games held in Rabat, Morocco. He competed in the men's 200 metres event and he did not qualify to compete in the semi-finals.

References

External links 
 

Living people
1998 births
Place of birth missing (living people)
Guinean male sprinters
World Athletics Championships athletes for Guinea
Athletes (track and field) at the 2019 African Games
African Games competitors for Guinea
Athletes (track and field) at the 2014 Summer Youth Olympics